Spittin' Chiclets is an ice hockey podcast airing twice a week produced by Barstool Sports. It is hosted by former National Hockey League players, Paul "Biz Nasty" Bissonnette and Ryan Whitney as well as hockey blogger Brian "Rear Admiral" McGonagle. The podcast debuted on October 14, 2016, and has since become the most popular hockey podcast in the world. The success of the podcast has led to Bissonnette becoming a contributor for NHL on TNT, Whitney becoming a contributor for NHL Network and the creation of Big Deal Brewing by Labatt Brewing Company, and Pink Whitney Vodka by New Amsterdam which has annual sales of over 100 million dollars and is North America's fastest growing flavored vodka brand as of 2021.

History 
Spittin' Chiclets was launched by Barstool Sports in October 2016 by former NHL player Ryan Whitney and Barstool Sports hockey blogger Brian "RA" McGonagle. The podcast began as an "Average Joe" interviewing a former NHL player to learn the behind the scenes truth of playing in the NHL. In the 13th episode of the series, former NHL 4th liner Paul Bissonnette joined as the shows third host for one episode, and would officially join in 2018. The show quickly gained popularity due to its recurring guests of NHL players, humor and banter between the hosts. Spittin' Chiclets is currently among the most popular sports podcasts in the United States and is in the top 5 most popular podcasts in Canada of any genre.

Pink Whitney 
Pink Whitney is a brand of vodka launched as a joint venture between Barstool Sports and E & J Gallo Winery's New Amsterdam Vodka label. The idea for the drink was spawned during an ad read for New Amsterdam Vodka where the hosts were asked how they drink their vodka. Host Ryan Whitney would answer that he mixes his vodka with pink lemonade and that anyone with "any brains" “any balls" and "any sort of confidence" would do the same. Fans of the show quickly began mixing pink lemonade with their vodka inspiring New Amsterdam Vodka and Barstool Sports to partner to create the drink for commercial sale. The drink became a massive success and now annually sells over 100 million dollars worth of vodka and is North America's fastest growing flavored vodka brand.

Big Deal Brew 
In 2022, in conjunction with Labatt Brewing Company, Spittin' Chiclets announced a beer venture named Big Deal Brewing, deriving from the popular slogan that the podcast coined. The first beer was the Golden Ale which hit shelves in October 2022.

Spin-Off 
In October 2022, at a live show in Pittsburgh, it was announced that the podcast would have a once-a-month spin-off show titled Chiclets Game Notes. (Originally titled Chiclets Etc.) with Whitney and Bissonnette's former teammates Colby Armstrong and Matt Murley, who already was appearing on the show on a semi-regular basis as a gambling analyst.

References

External links
 

Comedy and humor podcasts
Sports podcasts
2016 podcast debuts
Audio podcasts 
American podcasts
Canadian podcasts
Ice hockey culture
2016 establishments in New York (state)